"Two-Timin' Me" is a song written and recorded by American country music group The Remingtons.  It was released in June 1992 as the third single from the album Blue Frontier.  The song reached number 18 on the Billboard Hot Country Singles & Tracks chart.

Content
The song is composed in the key of A major with a main chord pattern of A-Fm7-E-D. Group members Richard Mainegra, Jimmy Griffin, and Rick Yancey wrote the song together.

Chart performance

References

1992 singles
The Remingtons songs
Song recordings produced by Josh Leo
Songs written by Jimmy Griffin
BNA Records singles
Songs written by Richard Mainegra
1992 songs